Moroteuthopsis (previously Kondakovia) is a genus of squid in the family Onychoteuthidae. The type species is Moroteuthopsis longimana.

References

External links
Tree of Life web project: Kondakovia
Laptikhovsky, V.; Arkhipkin, A.; Bolstad, K.S. 2008. A second species of the squid genus Kondakovia (Cephalopoda: Onychoteuthidae) from the sub-Antarctic.

Squid
Cephalopod genera